Gobiopsis quinquecincta, the fiveband barbelgoby, is a species of goby found in the Indo-West Pacific and Asia areas.

Size

References

Gobiidae
Taxa named by Hugh McCormick Smith
Fish described in 1931